Hongkongia is a genus of Asian ground spiders that was first described by D. X. Song & Ming-Sheng Zhu in 1998.

Species
 it contains four species:
Hongkongia caeca Deeleman-Reinhold, 2001 – Indonesia (Moluccas)
Hongkongia reptrix Deeleman-Reinhold, 2001 – Indonesia (Java, Borneo, Bali)
Hongkongia songi Zhang, Zhu & Tso, 2009 – Taiwan
Hongkongia wuae Song & Zhu, 1998 (type) – China, Hong Kong, Indonesia (Sulawesi)

References

Araneomorphae genera
Gnaphosidae
Spiders of Asia
Spiders of Oceania